Greg Andrusak (born November 14, 1969) is a Canadian former professional ice hockey player.

Andrusak played 43 games in the National Hockey League for the Pittsburgh Penguins and Toronto Maple Leafs. He scored a goal and scored seven points.

Career statistics

Regular season and playoffs

International

Awards and honors

Transactions
On June 11, 1988 the Pittsburgh Penguins selected Greg Andrusak in the fifth-round (#88 overall) of the 1988 NHL draft.
On July 9, 1999 the Toronto Maple Leafs signed unrestricted free agent Greg Andrusak.
On August 14, 2000 the San Jose Sharks signed unrestricted free agent Greg Andrusak.
On January 5, 2002 the HC Lugano (Swiss) signed free agent Greg Andrusak.

External links

1969 births
Living people
Berlin Capitals players
Canadian expatriate ice hockey players in Germany
Canadian expatriate ice hockey players in Switzerland
Canadian expatriate ice hockey players in the United States
Canadian ice hockey defencemen
Chicago Wolves (IHL) players
Cleveland Lumberjacks players
Detroit Vipers players
ECH Chur players
Eisbären Berlin players
Hamburg Freezers players
Genève-Servette HC players
HC Lugano players
Houston Aeros (1994–2013) players
Ice hockey people from British Columbia
Kelowna Spartans players
Kentucky Thoroughblades players
Minnesota Duluth Bulldogs men's ice hockey players
Minnesota Moose players
Muskegon Fury players
Pittsburgh Penguins players
Pittsburgh Penguins draft picks
Sportspeople from Cranbrook, British Columbia
Toronto Maple Leafs players